Gaëlle Barlet (born 1988) is a French orienteer who competes in mountain bike orienteering, ski orienteering and foot orienteering. She is a former world champion in mountain bike orienteering. 

At the 2011 World MTB Orienteering Championships in Vicenza, she won a gold medal in the sprint, ahead of Marika Hara from Finland and Michaela Gigon from Australia. She also won 4 medals at the European Championships, including the title on the middle in 2015.

References

External links

French orienteers
Female orienteers
French female cyclists
Mountain bike orienteers
Living people
1988 births
Place of birth missing (living people)
21st-century French women